Little Big Shots is an Australian variety show which premiered on the Seven Network on 27 August 2017. The program, based on the American format of the same name, is hosted by Shane Jacobson and features performances by children aged 3 to 13 years old. The program is produced by Warner Bros. International Television Production.

The program was set to premiere on 16 July 2017, but was delayed due to the ratings success of Australian Ninja Warrior on rival channel Nine Network, it subsequently premiered on 27 August 2017. In September 2017, the series was renewed for a second season, this time featuring children aged 4 to 13.

Although the series did not return in 2019, auditions for a third season were announced in August 2019 for an expected broadcast in 2020. Seven ultimately postponed plans for the new season in January 2020 to an unspecified future date.

List of Acts

Season 1 (2017)
List of acts that appeared throughout the inaugural season.

Season 2 (2018)

Ratings

Season 1 (2017)

Season 2 (2018)

References

External links
Little Big Shots Official Site
Little Big Shots on 7plus

2017 Australian television series debuts
2018 Australian television series endings
Seven Network original programming
English-language television shows
Television series by Warner Bros. Television Studios
2010s Australian reality television series
Australian television series based on American television series
Television series about children
Television series about teenagers